The Porte-class gate vessels were a class of five boom defence vessels built in the early 1950s and operated by the Royal Canadian Navy (RCN) and Canadian Forces (CF) during the Cold War. The class derived its name from the gates of the French fortifications of Québec and Louisbourg and was designed by the RCN as a replacement for World War I-era s used to operate anti-submarine booms during World War II. The Porte class were used primarily as training vessels during the Cold War.

Design and description
The Porte class were designed with the possibility of commercial adoption of the design by the Canadian fishing industry. The gate vessels were planned for use as auxiliary vessels during peacetime. The Porte class was of a trawler design, and were designed to operate the anti-submarine booms for harbour defence. They were also capable of being fitted for minelaying.

They displaced  fully loaded and had an initial complement of 3 officers and 20 ratings. The Porte class were powered one Fairbanks-Morse 6-cylinder diesel engine driving one shaft creating . They were equipped with one Racal Decca navigation radar operating on the I band. The ships were armed with one 40 mm gun placed forward.

Ships

Service history
The first Porte-class vessel was ordered September 1949. Porte Saint Jean and Porte Saint Louis were based at Halifax, Nova Scotia and Porte Dauphine, Porte Québec and Porte de la Reine at Esquimalt, British Columbia. From 1958 to 1974, Porte Dauphine was loaned to the Department of Transport (DOT) as an environmental research ship on the Great Lakes, before transferring to the West Coast via the Panama Canal. Porte Dauphine was modified for DOT use, which involved the installation of a widened wheelhouse and a cafeteria. The vessels were used to train naval reserve crews in key trades such as navigation, diesel mechanics, communications and logistics. They sometimes travelled to Bermuda for training. In 1973, Porte Saint Jean and Porte Saint Louis sailed into the eastern Arctic. With the arrival of the s in the mid-1990s, the Porte class was retired. Porte Dauphine was the first, discarded in December 1995, followed by Porte Saint Jean and Porte Saint Louis in March 1996 and Porte Québec and Porte de la Reine in December 1996.

Citations

Sources
 
 
 
 

 
Cold War naval ships of Canada
Auxiliary ships of the Royal Canadian Navy
Auxiliary gateship classes